PGT may refer to:

 Partido Guatemalteco del Trabajo (Guatemalan Party of Labor), a Guatemalan political party from 1949 to 1998
 Pegasus Airlines (ICAO code PGT)
 Urban-type settlement (posyolok gorodskogo tipa), in the former Soviet Union
 Pilipinas Got Talent
Preimplantation genetic testing (see Preimplantation genetic diagnosis)
 Public Guardian and Trustee (Ontario)
 Puccinia graminis f. sp. tritici, stem rust of wheat and barley